Events in the year 1967 in Germany.

Incumbents
President – Heinrich Lübke 
Chancellor – Kurt Georg Kiesinger

Events
 Germany in the Eurovision Song Contest 1967
 June 23 - July 4 - 17th Berlin International Film Festival
 July 2 - East German general election, 1967
September 29 -  The electronic music group Tangerine Dream was founded by Edgar Froese in West-Berlin.
 Date unknown - In 1967, a majority share of the German company Braun AG was acquired by the Boston, Massachusetts-based conglomerate Gillette Group.
 Date unknown - The first hydraulic breaker "Hydraulikhammer HM 400" was invented by German company Krupp.

Births 
January 5 - Markus Söder, German politician
January 20 - Wigald Boning, German actor, singer, writer and television presenter
January 25 - Nicole Uphoff, German equestrian
February 15 - Jan Hecker, German lawyer and diplomat (died 2021)
March 8 - Udo Quellmalz, German judoka
March 20 - Stephan Kampwirth, German actress
April 7 - Alex Christensen, German singer, DJ and composer
April 20 - Ingo Appelt, German comedian
May 10 - Antje Harvey, German cross country skier and biathlete
May 14 - Tillmann Uhrmacher, German DJ, musician and radio host (died 2011)
May 15 - Andrea Jürgens, German singer (died 2017)
May 23 - Wotan Wilke Möhring, German actor
May 27 - Kai Pflaume, German television presenter
June 4 - Marcus Weinberg, German politician
June 16 - Jürgen Klopp, German football manager
June 24
 Michael Kessler, German actor and comedian
 Richard Kruspe, German musician
June 28 - Lars Riedel, German discus thrower
June 30 - Silke Renk, German javelin thrower
July 1 - Peter Plate, German singer
July 28 - Jakob Augstein, German journalist
August 25 - Eckart von Hirschhausen, German physician and television presenter
September 5 - Matthias Sammer, German football player
September 7 - Natalia Wörner, German actress
September 21 - Vera Int-Veen, Gernab television presenter
September 25 - Armin Baumgarten, German painter and sculptor
September 28 -Steffen Zesner, German swimmer
October 19 - Alexander Ebner, German social scientist and university professor
October 27 - Natascha Kohnen, German politician
October 28 - Martin Brambach, German actor
November 22 - Boris Becker, German tennis player
November 7 - Olaf Schubert, German comedian

Deaths
January 7 - Carl Schuricht, German conductor (born 1880)
January 11 - Wolfgang Zeller, German composer (born 1893)
January 29 - Marten von Barnekow, German equestrian (born 1900)
January 31 - F. K. Otto Dibelius, German bishop of the Evangelical Church in Berlin-Brandenburg (born 1880)
February 28 — Gerhard Roßbach, German Freikorps leader and paramilitary (born 1893)
March 29 - Fritz Schäffer, German politician (born 1888)
April 19 — Konrad Adenauer, German politician, former Chancellor of Germany (born 1876)
May 9 — Oskar Hergt, German politician (born 1869)
May 27 - Paul Henckels, German actor (born 1885)
June 2 — Benno Ohnesorg, German student (born 1940)
 July 9 - Eugen Fischer, German physician (born 1874)
July 21 - Thomas Dehler, German politician (born 1897)
July 30 - Alfried Krupp von Bohlen und Halbach, German industrialist (born 1907)
28 August — Christian Stock, German politician (born 1884)
31 August - Trude Hesterberg, German actress (born 1892)
27 October - Theodor Steltzer, German politician (born 1885)
30 November - Josias, Hereditary Prince of Waldeck and Pyrmont (born 1896)
30 November - Heinz Tietjen, German conductor (born 1881)

See also
 1967 in German television

References

 
Years of the 20th century in Germany
1960s in Germany
Germany
Germany